The Global Change Research Act 1990 is a United States law requiring research into global warming and related issues. It requires a report to Congress every four years on the environmental, economic, health and safety consequences of climate change.

According to a summary by the Congressional Research Service, the Act:

Following the publication of the first National Climate Assessment Report there were accusations that information was being suppressed, leading to complacency around public works, such as New Orleans flood defences. Greenpeace, the Center for Biological Diversity and Friends of the Earth challenged the delay in federal district court on August 21, 2007. A judge ruled that an updated national assessment must be produced by May 31, 2008.

See also
 Committee on Climate Change Science and Technology Integration
 National Climate Assessment

References

External links
 Text of the act
 Resource Library
 US Global Change Research Program
 Climate Change Technology Program (CCTP)
 Reuters: Climate Report May Have Cut Katrina Impact
 
 
 

1990 in law
101st United States Congress
United States federal environmental legislation
Climate change policy
1990 in the environment